Minden is a city and parish seat in Webster Parish, Louisiana, United States. It is located twenty-eight miles east of Shreveport. As of the 2010 census, the city had a total population of 13,082.

History 
Minden was established in 1836 by Charles Veeder. Native sons include Gene Austin and Louis Dunbar.

The town's name is derived from the German city of Minden.

During the Civil War, a large Confederate encampment was located inside of Minden. It housed about 15,000 Confederate soldiers. The town served as a supply depot for the Confederate Army. Close to thirty Confederate soldiers who died in the Battles of Mansfield and Pleasant Hill are buried in the Old Minden Cemetery.

During the Great Depression, one of the two Minden banks failed and a fire destroyed a major section of the downtown area (1931).

On May 1, 1933, a tornado occurred in the town, destroying 20% of the homes.

Geography
According to the United States Census Bureau, the city has a total area of 31.0 km² (12.0 mi²). 30.8 km (11.9 mi²) of it is land and 0.2 km (0.1 mi²) of it is water. The total area is 0.75% water.

Climate

Demographics

2020 census

As of the 2020 United States census, there were 11,928 people, 5,189 households, and 3,126 families residing in the city.

2000 census
At the 2000 census, there were 13,027 people in 5,166 households, including 3,430 families, in the city. The population density was 423.0/km (1,095.2/mi²). There were 5,795 housing units at an average density of 188.2/km (487.2/mi²). The racial makeup of the city was 46.34% White, 52.17% African American, 0.31% Native American, 0.27% Asian, 0.09% Pacific Islander, 0.21% from other races, and 0.65% from two or more races. 0.61% of the population were Hispanic or Latino of any race.

Of the 5,166 households 30.5% had children under the age of 18 living with them, 39.6% were married couples living together, 22.8% had a female householder with no husband present, and 33.6% were non-families. 30.9% of households were one person and 15.1% were one person aged 65 or older. The average household size was 2.44 and the average family size was 3.05.

The age distribution was 27.0% under the age of 18, 8.6% from 18 to 24, 25.3% from 25 to 44, 21.2% from 45 to 64, and 17.9% 65 or older. The median age was 37 years. For every 100 females there were 84.0 males. For every 100 females age 18 and over, there were 77.7 males.

The median household income was $24,175 and the median family income  was $31,477. Males had a median income of $28,401 versus $19,199 for females. The per capita income for the city was $14,114. 26.6% of the population and 21.0% of families were below the poverty line. 39.3% of those under the age of 18 and 20.1% of those 65 and older were living below the poverty line.

Notable People
 L'Jarius Sneed (born 1997), NFL cornerback for the Kansas City Chiefs

References

 
Cities in Louisiana
Cities in the Ark-La-Tex
Cities in Webster Parish, Louisiana
Parish seats in Louisiana
Populated places established in 1836
County seats in the Ark-La-Tex
1836 establishments in Louisiana